Blangpidie or Blang Pidie is a town in the Aceh province of Indonesia and it is the capital of Southwest Aceh Regency. Blangpidie is located on the west coast of Sumatra island and the main Banda Aceh — Medan road passes through the town.

Demography
The population of Blangpidie District at the 2020 Census was 23,810 persons. The official estimate as at mid 2021 was 24,085, comprising 12,011 males and 12,074 females.

Transportation
The city is served by the Blangpidie Airport .

References

Southwest Aceh Regency
Regency seats of Aceh